West Tulang Bawang Regency is a regency (kabupaten) of Lampung Province, Sumatra, Indonesia. It has an area of 1,201.15 km2 and had a population of 250,707 people at the 2010 Census and 286,162 at the 2020 Census. The regency seat is the town of Panaragan Jaya.

Administrative districts
At the time of the 2010 Census the Regency comprised eight districts (kecamatan), but subsequently a ninth district - Batu Putih - was created from part of Gunung Terang District. The districts are listed below with their areas and their populations at the 2010 Census and the 2020 Census.

Note: the 2010 population of Batu Putih District was included in the figure for Gunung Terang District, from which it was subsequently cut out.

References

Regencies of Lampung